Essam Marei,born February 1, 1965, is a former Egyptian professional footballer.

Honours
El-Mokawloon
Egypt Cup: 1
 1989–90

Zamalek
Egyptian Premier League: 2
 1991–92, 1992–93
African Cup of Champions Clubs: 2
 1993, 1996
CAF Super Cup: 2
1994, 1997
Afro-Asian Club Championship: 1
 1997

References

External links
Essam Marei at Footballdatabase

Living people
Year of birth missing (living people)
Egyptian footballers
Zamalek SC players
Al Aluminium SC managers
Egyptian Premier League players
Association footballers not categorized by position
Egyptian football managers